The list of shipwrecks in 1978 includes ships sunk, foundered, grounded, or otherwise lost during 1978.

January

7 January

12 January

13 January

26 January

February

2 February

3 February

7 February

10 February

23 February

March

10 March

16 March

19 March

23 March

April

1 April

7 April

14 April

May

2 May

6 May

12 May

19 May

22 May

29 May

30 May

June

12 June

13 June

17 June

25 June

28 June

July

1 July

2 July

5 July

8 July

18 July

23 July

30 July

August

3 August

12 August

18 August

24 August

27 August

September

1 September

6 September

8 September

13 September

14 September

18 September

20 September

27 September

29 September

Unknown date

October

2 October

3 October

9 October

12 October

18 October

20 October

23 October

30 October

31 October

November

3 November

4 November

7 November

8 November

16 November

20 November

23 November

30 November

Unknown date

December

1 December

7 December

11 December

12 December

13 December

14 December

22 December

30 December

Unknown date

References

See also 

1978
 
Ships